Pardis Fardjad-Azad  (born 12 April 1988) is a German-born second striker of Iranian background. He plays for CFC Hertha 06. He made his debut for the Azerbaijan national football team in 2013.

Career
Fardjad-Azad began his career at FC Hertha 03 Zehlendorf and moved in summer 2007 from the A youth team of his club to FC Carl Zeiss Jena. After two years with FC Carl Zeiss Jena, he left on 7 July 2009 and signed a one-year contract for VFC Plauen.

On 28 January 2015, Fardjad-Azad signed a new 18-month contract with Sumgayit FK, having been without a club for six months recovering from a knee injury.

On 20 July 2019, Fardjad-Azad signed with FC Viktoria 1889 Berlin.

Career statistics

International career

Fardjad-Azad made his international debut for Azerbaijan in 2013, making his debut against Luxembourg on 22 March 2013.

Personal life
Fardjad-Azad is of Iranian background.

References

1988 births
Living people
German footballers
Azerbaijani footballers
Iranian footballers
Azerbaijani expatriate footballers
Association football forwards
FC Carl Zeiss Jena players
Sumgayit FK players
Shamakhi FK players
Zira FK players
FC Viktoria 1889 Berlin players
Berliner AK 07 players
CFC Hertha 06 players
Regionalliga players
2. Bundesliga players
Azerbaijan Premier League players
Oberliga (football) players
German people of Azerbaijani descent
German people of Iranian descent
Azerbaijani people of Iranian descent
Sportspeople of Iranian descent
People from East Berlin
Footballers from Berlin
Azerbaijan international footballers